Dallin Harris Oaks (born August 12, 1932) is an American religious leader and former jurist and academic who since 2018 has been the first counselor in the First Presidency of the Church of Jesus Christ of Latter-day Saints (LDS Church). He was called as a member of the church's Quorum of the Twelve Apostles in 1984. Currently, he is the second most senior apostle by years of service and is the President of the Quorum of the Twelve Apostles. 

Oaks was born and raised in Provo, Utah. He studied accounting at Brigham Young University (BYU), then went to law school  at the University of Chicago, where he was editor-in-chief of the University of Chicago Law Review and graduated in 1957 with a J.D. cum laude.  Oaks was a law clerk for Chief Justice Earl Warren of the U.S. Supreme Court, then spent three years in private practice at Kirkland & Ellis before returning to the University of Chicago as a professor of law in 1961. He taught at Chicago until 1971, when he was chosen to succeed Ernest L. Wilkinson as the president of BYU.  Oaks was BYU's president from 1971 until 1980 and was then appointed to the Utah Supreme Court, on which he served until his selection to the LDS Church's Quorum of the Twelve Apostles in 1984.

During his professional career, Oaks was twice considered by the U.S. president for nomination to the U.S. Supreme Court: first in 1975 by Gerald Ford, who ultimately nominated John Paul Stevens, and again in 1981 by Ronald Reagan, who ultimately nominated Sandra Day O'Connor.

Background
Dallin Oaks was born on August 12, 1932, in Provo, Utah, to Stella (née Harris) and Lloyd E. Oaks. Through his mother, he is a 2nd great-grand-nephew of one of the three witnesses to the Book of Mormon, Martin Harris.  He was given the name Dallin in honor of Utah artist Cyrus Dallin.  His mother was the artist's model for The Pioneer Mother, a public statue in Springville, Utah. She was present for the unveiling of the statue less than three weeks before Dallin Oaks was born.

Early life
Oaks was injured in a car accident that threw him from the car when he was nine months old, which was reported in both the Provo and Vernal newspapers. When Oaks was two years old, his father moved the family from Provo to Twin Falls, Idaho, where they would live until Oaks was eight. Oaks began his schooling at Washington School in Twin Falls. His father served as a member of the Twin Falls Stake's high council. Oaks was hospitalized twice with pneumonia while living in Twin Falls. In October 1939, when Oaks was 7 and his father was 37, Lloyd Oaks was hospitalized in Twin Falls with what was initially diagnosed as cancer. After 16 days he was transferred to a hospital in Salt Lake City, Utah, where he was diagnosed with tuberculosis. Lloyd Oaks was then transferred to the Bethesda Tuberculosis Sanitorium in Denver, Colorado, where he remained for about seven months until he died.

After the death of her husband, Stella Oaks suffered an episode of mental illness and was unable to attend school and work for a time. During this time, Oaks and his two younger siblings resided with their maternal grandparents in Payson, Utah. The loss of his father and the temporary loss of his mother caused him to have difficulties concentrating in school. When he was about nine or ten years old, he resumed living with his mother, who had taken a position as a teacher in Vernal, Utah.

Both of his parents were graduates of BYU. After his father died, his mother pursued a graduate degree at Columbia University and later served as head of adult education for the Provo School District. In 1956, she became the first woman to sit on the Provo City Council, where she served for two terms. In 1958, she also briefly served as Provo's assistant mayor.

From about age 10 to 16 Oaks and his younger brother and sister spent the school year in Vernal, Utah, and the summer in Payson, Utah, with his maternal grandparents while his mother pursued her graduate degree at Columbia. During these years his mother was a high school teacher in Vernal. Oaks obtained his first job at the age of twelve at a radio repair shop in Vernal sweeping the floors. He later worked as an engineer and announcer for stations in both Vernal (KJAM) and Provo (KCSU). He had obtained his first-class radio operator license in the spring of 1948.

During his first two years of high school Oaks attended Uintah High School in Vernal, where he was on the football team, involved in debate, and played the oboe in the school band. At the start of his 11th-grade year, the Oaks family moved to Provo, where he chose to attend Brigham Young High School (B Y High) because it was smaller than Provo High School. At B Y High, he was again involved in football, track, playing the oboe in the band, and dramatic productions. Oaks graduated from B Y High in 1950.

Oaks was involved in Boy Scouts and earned the rank of Eagle Scout at age 14.

Education
After high school, Oaks attended BYU, where he occasionally served as a radio announcer at high school basketball games. At one of these basketball games during his freshman year at BYU, he met June Dixon, a senior at the high school, whom he married during his junior year at BYU. Due to his membership in the Utah National Guard and the threat of being called up to serve in the Korean War, Oaks was unable to serve as an LDS Church missionary. In 1952, Oaks married Dixon in the Salt Lake Temple. He graduated from BYU in accounting with high honors in 1954.

Oaks attended the University of Chicago Law School on a full-tuition National Honor Scholarship, where he served as editor-in-chief of the University of Chicago Law Review during his third year. Oaks graduated with a Juris Doctor cum laude in 1957.

Career
After graduating from law school in 1957, Oaks spent a year as a law clerk to chief justice Earl Warren of the U.S. Supreme Court. After his clerkship, he entered private practice at the law firm Kirkland & Ellis, where he specialized in corporate litigation. Oaks had worked with this firm twice before, first during a summer in law school and then for a few months before he began his clerkship with Justice Warren. When Oaks began work at Kirkland & Ellis he worked under Robert Bork but he was quickly appointed as one of the principal lawyers. He mainly worked on cases for clients Standard Oil of Indiana, B. F. Goodrich and Chemetron Corporation, but also assisted with cases with several other companies. Initially they lived fairly far west in the suburbs of Chicago, but in 1960 the Oaks bought a house in Elmhurst, Illinois. According to historian Lavina Fielding Anderson, Oaks was the first lawyer from Kirkland & Ellis to represent an indigent party before the Illinois Supreme Court. This case was also the first time Oaks argued a case before an appellate court.

In 1961, Oaks left Kirkland & Ellis and became a professor at the University of Chicago Law School. During part of his time on the faculty of the Law School, Oaks served as interim dean.  During this time, Rex E. Lee was among the students he sought to get placed in Supreme Court clerkships. As a faculty member, Oaks taught primarily in the fields of trust and estate law, as well as gift taxation law. He worked with George Bogert on a new edition of a casebook on trusts. In 1963, Oaks edited a book entitled The Wall Between Church and State covering discussions on views on the relationship of the government and religion in the law and the aptness of that metaphor. He also wrote an article on the school prayer cases aimed at a lay audience that was published in the LDS Church's Improvement Era in December 1963. He also wrote on issues of evidence exclusion and the Fourth Amendment. He was opposed to the exclusionary rule and favored prosection in "victim-less crimes". In the summer of 1964, he served as assistant state's attorney for Cook County, Illinois. In the fall of 1964, Oaks was appointed a full professor at the University of Chicago law school. While at the University of Chicago, Oaks was the faculty advisor to the legal aid clinic at that institution. He also worked to find ways to address the root issues facing the poor. He felt the federal anti-poverty programs of the time focused too much on symptoms and not enough on causes. Oaks served as a visiting professor at the University of Michigan Law School during the summer of 1968.

In 1968, he became a founding member of the editorial board of Dialogue: A Journal of Mormon Thought; he resigned from the journal in early 1970. In 1969, Oaks served as chairman of the University of Chicago disciplinary committee. In conducting hearings against the 160 students who had been involved in a sit-in at the administration building, Oaks was physically attacked twice. Over 100 students were eventually either suspended or expelled. During the first half of 1970, Oaks took a leave of absence from the University of Chicago while serving as legal counsel to the Bill of Rights Committee of the Illinois Constitutional Convention, which caused him to work closely with the committee chair, Elmer Gertz. From 1970 to 1971, Oaks served as the executive director of the American Bar Foundation. Oaks left the University of Chicago Law School when he was appointed the president of BYU in 1971. In 1975, Oaks was one of eleven considered to be nominated for the vacancy in the United States Supreme Court.

Oaks also served five years as chairman of the board of directors of the Public Broadcasting Service (1979–84) and eight years as chairman of the board of directors of the Polynesian Cultural Center. Additionally, over the course of his career, Oaks served as a director of the Union Pacific Corporation and Union Pacific Railroad.

BYU president

After the resignation of Ernest L. Wilkinson as BYU's 7th president, Neal A. Maxwell, who was the Commissioner of the Church Educational System, created a search committee for a new president, without any good leads on candidates. Both Wilkinson and University of Utah Vice President Jerry R. Anderson recommended to Maxwell that Oaks be interviewed. He was offered the position and assumed his duties on August 1, 1971. From 1971 to 1980, Oaks served as BYU's 8th president. Oaks oversaw the start of the J. Reuben Clark Law School and the Graduate Business School. Bruce C. Hafen was the main assistant and point man to Oaks in the process of setting up the law school.

Although university enrollment continued to grow and new buildings were added, neither was done at the pace of the previous administration. Unlike his predecessor, Oaks took a hands-off approach to the discipline of the university students specifically in relation to the Church Educational System Honor Code. He believed that should be delegated to the dean of students. Oaks was well-liked and became a popular president, contrasting the austerity of the Wilkinson administration. Oaks created a Faculty Advisory Council where faculty members could be elected to the committee. He also instituted a three-tiered system of general education examinations for undergraduates.

When Oaks took office as BYU president, he retained Robert K. Thomas as academic vice president and Ben E. Lewis as executive vice president, the same positions they had held under Wilkinson. Early in his administration, Oaks sought to delegate more authority to deans and department chairs. He also worked to create standardized lines of authority within the university.

Other major changes under Oaks included implementing a three-semester plan with full fall and winter semesters, and a split spring and summer term. This also shifted the end of the fall term to before Christmas. Oaks also oversaw a large-scale celebration of the BYU centennial. During his tenure at BYU, enrollment grew twenty percent; the average class size was maintained at thirty-four students. Library holdings increased to 2 million and the number of faculty members with doctorate degrees increased to 22 percent. The number of buildings constructed per year decreased to eight per year, compared to eleven per year during Wilkinson's administration. Church appropriations increased from $19.5 million to $76 million, making up approximately one-third of the university's income. Spending increased from $60 million to $240 million. Under the realization that faculty salaries were considerably low compared to other colleges in the western United States, BYU periodically increased the salary of employees, particularly female employees. Even with the raising of salaries, BYU faculty salaries were still about $1,000 less than other universities and colleges in the region. University income was bolstered by donations and fund-raising. In the mid-1960s, the university decided to name buildings after people who donated more than $500,000 to the university. The first building constructed entirely from private donations was the N. Eldon Tanner Building.

During his administration, Oaks worked to focus on the equal treatment of women in the workplace. BYU instituted affirmative action policies to hire more women and worked to equalize salaries of men and women employees. Despite affirmative actions policies, the number of female full professors was almost unchanged after his presidency and BYU was behind other universities in the United States in the number of female employees by five percent. Oaks established an ad hoc committee over women's affairs to investigate gender discrimination at BYU. In 1975, BYU instituted policies prohibiting unfair distribution of church-sponsored scholarships based on gender. While at BYU, Oaks led an effort to fight the application of Title IX to non-educational programs at schools that did not accept direct government aid. BYU was one of two initial schools to voice opposition to these policies. This issue ultimately ended in an agreement between the U.S. Department of Education and BYU that allowed BYU to retain requirements that all unmarried students live in gender-specific housing whether they lived on or off campus. Oaks was a proponent for a lack of federal government intrusion in the private education sector and served as president of the American Association of Presidents of Independent Colleges and Universities for three years.

His administration dealt with multiple attempts by the federal government to exert control over BYU. In 1975, what was then the U.S. Department of Housing, Education and Welfare, tried an unsuccessful attempt to state that BYU's honor code was in some way discriminatory based on sex. The next year, the Justice Department tried to exert power against small landlords to no longer uphold BYU's sex-separated housing standard, but BYU also prevail in this matter. In 1979, the Internal Revenue Service tried to force BYU to disclose names of its donors on the contention that they were over-valuing the worth of their donation to BYU. This case went to federal court where it was ruled that the demand was unjustified.

During his presidency, he co-authored Carthage Conspiracy: The Trial of the Accused Assassins of Joseph Smith with BYU professor of history Marvin S. Hill. The book received the Mormon History Association Best Book prize in 1976.

During his presidency at BYU, Oaks was known for his moderate personal views which largely contrasted with the ultra-conservative views of his predecessor, Wilkinson. Oaks struggled during his presidency to distance BYU and the LDS Church from the partisan political atmosphere that had become typical under Wilkinson. Oaks established a policy to prevent BYU administrators from participating in partisan politics. Oaks continued to attempt to separate politics from BYU in his dealings with W. Cleon Skousen. Skousen, a known anti-communist, was hired as a BYU religion professor by Wilkinson. Other professors in the religion department were very critical of his hiring, believing he was unqualified for the position and was only hired because of his conservative viewpoints. During the Oaks administration, Skousen claimed to have been authorized to teach a new course about "Priesthood and Righteous Government", which would be published clandestinely under the name "Gospel Principles and Practices". This course was intended to be for ultra-conservative students to inform them of what to do about communist infiltration. Upon learning of Skousen's intentions, Oaks informed the First Presidency that he would not be permitted to teach that course. Skousen was told to stop mixing church doctrine and politics and to stop activities associated with his educational politics-based organization called the "Freeman Institute", now known as the National Center for Constitutional Studies. However, he largely ignored this instruction, and continued teaching his version of politically-infused doctrine until his retirement from BYU in 1978. By the mid-1970s, the relationship between Oaks and some of the more conservative members of the Board of Trustees became strained, particularly with Ezra Taft Benson. During Oaks's tenure, Benson condemned the undergraduate economics textbooks used as supporting "Keynesian" economics and he expressed concern as to whether faculty was teaching socialist economics. Oaks was displeased upon learning that the College of Social Sciences invited the leader of Utah's Communist party to speak to political science classes, believing that it could have set an undesired precedent. Not long afterward, Oaks became upset when he learned that Benson had invited activist Phyllis Schlafy to address students despite having been rejected by the Speakers Committee previously due to her "extreme" views. Most prominently, Oaks fought against the hiring of conservative Richard Vetterli despite the promise Wilkinson had made in hiring him before his resignation. Wilkinson lobbied Benson in appointing Vetterli after he left BYU and Benson and the Board of Trustees approved his appointment despite claims from Oaks that Vetterli was not qualified. Soon afterward, Oaks was released as BYU president and Jeffrey R. Holland took his place. The press cited the stand-off between Benson and Oaks in regards to Vetterli as a contributing factor to Oaks's release. Oaks on the other hand fully stated his leaving BYU was caused by his being worn out from having run the institution for nine years.

When Oaks had been in office for six years, he wrote to the First Presidency believing that he had become close-minded in his position and suggested that BYU establish a six- or seven-year term limit for its presidents. His proposal was tabled for more than two years before he was unexpectedly notified of his release by the news media. After serving for nine years, he stepped down in August 1980. Oaks was appointed to the Utah Supreme Court three months later.

Utah Supreme Court

Upon leaving BYU, Oaks was appointed as a justice of the Utah Supreme Court on January 1, 1981, by Utah governor Scott M. Matheson. He served in this capacity from 1980 to 1984, when he resigned after being appointed by the LDS Church as a member of the Quorum of the Twelve Apostles. In 1975, Oaks was listed by U.S. attorney general Edward H. Levi among potential Gerald Ford Supreme Court candidates. In 1981, he was closely considered by the Ronald Reagan administration as a Supreme Court nominee.

Scholarly research and notable opinions
As a law professor, Oaks focused his scholarly research on the writ of habeas corpus and the exclusionary rule. In California v. Minjares, Justice William H. Rehnquist, in a dissenting opinion, wrote "[t]he most comprehensive study on the exclusionary rule is probably that done by Dallin Oaks for the American Bar Foundation in 1970. According to this article, it is an open question whether the exclusionary rule deters the police from violating Fourth Amendment protections of individuals.

Oaks also undertook a legal analysis of the Nauvoo, city council's actions against the Nauvoo Expositor. He opined that while the destruction of the Expositor'''s printing press was legally questionable, under the law of the time the newspaper certainly could have been declared libelous and therefore a public nuisance by the Nauvoo City Council. As a result, Oaks concludes that while under contemporaneous law it would have been legally permissible for city officials to destroy, or "abate", the actual printed newspapers, the destruction of the printing press itself was probably outside of the council's legal authority, and its owners could have sued for damages.

As a Utah Supreme Court justice from 1980 to 1984, Oaks authored opinions on a variety of topics. In In Re J. P., a proceeding was instituted on a petition of the Division of Family Services to terminate parental rights of child J.P.'s natural mother. Oaks wrote that a parent has a fundamental right protected by the Constitution to sustain their relationship with their child but that a parent can nevertheless be deprived of parental rights upon a showing of unfitness, abandonment, and substantial neglect.

In KUTV, Inc. v. Conder, media representatives sought review by appeal and by a writ of prohibition of an order barring the media from using the words "Sugarhouse rapist" or disseminating any information on past convictions of the defendant during the pendency of a criminal trial. Oaks, in the opinion delivered by the court, held that the order barring the media from using the words "Sugarhouse rapist" or disseminating any information on past convictions of defendant during the pendency of the criminal trial was invalid on the ground that it was not accompanied by the procedural formalities required for the issuance of such an order.

In Wells v. Children's Aid Soc. of Utah, an unwed minor father brought action through a guardian ad litem seeking custody of a newborn child that had been released to the state adoption agency and subsequently to adoptive parents after the father had failed to make timely filing of his acknowledgment of paternity as required by statute. Oaks, writing the opinion for the court, held that the statute specifying the procedure for terminating parental rights of unwed fathers was constitutional under due process clause of the United States Constitution.

Among works edited by Oaks is a collection of essays entitled The Wall Between Church and State. Since becoming an apostle, Oaks has consistently spoken in favor of religious freedom and warned that it is under threat. He testified as an official representative of the LDS Church on behalf of the Religious Freedom Restoration Act during congressional hearings in 1991, and then in 1998 in favor of the Religious Land Use and Institutionalized Persons Act. This was one of few occasions on which the church has sent a representative to testify on behalf of a bill before the U.S. Congress.

LDS Church service

While a law student, Oaks served as an elders quorum leader in his ward in Chicago. After he returned to the Chicago Metro Area after being a clerk to Justice Warren, Oaks was a counselor in the ward Sunday School presidency starting in 1959. He also was a counselor in the presidency of the Chicago Stake genealogical organization. He was then called as a stake missionary and counselor in the stake mission presidency, a set of positions at the time that required him to spend about 40 hours a month proselytizing.

In 1962, Oaks served as the stake mission president in the church's Chicago Illinois Stake. He was set apart to this position by Boyd K. Packer, who was then an Assistant to the Quorum of the Twelve Apostles.

In 1963, he served as second counselor in the presidency of the newly created Chicago Illinois South Stake. He was set apart to this office by Howard W. Hunter. He later served briefly as the first counselor in the same stake in 1970, but was released when he was appointed as BYU's president and moved to Utah.

During part of his time as BYU president, Oaks served as a regional representative, assigned to oversee some of the stakes in the Salt Lake Valley. After leaving BYU, Oaks conducted research and other assignments for the church's special affairs committee, headed by Gordon B. Hinckley, and overseeing public relations, government relations, and related matters. In the years prior to his call as an apostle, Oaks served as a teacher in his ward Sunday School organization, first in a class for the 16-year-olds and later in the class for adults.

Quorum of the Twelve Apostles
On April 7, 1984, during the Saturday morning session of the LDS Church's general conference, Oaks was sustained an apostle and a member of the Quorum of the Twelve. In addition to advisory and operational duties, as a member of the Quorum of the Twelve, Oaks is accepted by the church as a prophet, seer, and revelator.

Although sustained on April 7, Oaks was not ordained an apostle until May 3, 1984. He was given this time between sustaining and ordination to complete his judicial commitments. Of the shift from judge to apostolic witness, Oaks commented, "Many years ago, Thomas Jefferson coined the metaphor, 'the wall between church and state.' I have heard the summons from the other side of the wall. I'm busy making the transition from one side of the wall to the other."  At age 51, he was the youngest apostle in the quorum at the time and the youngest man to be called to the quorum since Boyd K. Packer, who was called in 1970 at age 45.

From 1985 to 2000, and again from 2005 to 2010, Oaks served as one of the advisors to the church's history department, where he served with Russell M. Nelson in this assignment during the latter time period. For several years Oaks was also closely involved with the church's public relations operations.

Oaks has spoken on behalf of the LDS Church on political issues, primarily those affecting religious liberty. In 1992, he testified before committees in the United States Senate and the United States House of Representatives on the proposed Religious Freedom Restoration Act (RFRA), arguing that it would be a step in the right direction in maintaining protection of religious liberty after the precedent set by Employment Division v. Smith'' (1990). Oaks spoke again after the law had passed in 1993 and had subsequently been ruled unconstitutional a few years later.

In 1989 Oaks traveled to India to dedicate that country for the preaching of the gospel.

From 2002 to 2004, Oaks presided over the church's Philippines Area. Responsibility for presiding over such areas is generally delegated to members of the Quorums of the Seventy. The assignment of Oaks, along with Jeffrey R. Holland, who served in Chile at the same time, was aimed at addressing challenges in developing areas of the church, including rapid growth in membership, focus on retention of new converts, and training local leadership. During his first year as president, Oaks and his counselors, Angel Abrea and Richard J. Maynes, focused on three main goals: teaching doctrine and building faith, shifting efforts more towards retention, and establishing programs of activity for youth. In his second year there, Abrea was replaced by Rex E. Garrett and increasing both temple attendance and the number of Filipinos serving missions were added to their focus.

On February 26, 2010, Oaks addressed students at the annual Mormonism 101 Series convened at Harvard Law School.

In April 2015, included as part of an assignment to tour Argentina, Oaks gave a speech on religious freedom to the Argentine Council for International Relations.

Among other assignments, Oaks has served as the senior member of the Quorum of the Twelve Apostles on the Church Board of Education and Boards of Trustees (CES Board), including as chairman of its Executive Committee.

Counselor in the First Presidency
In January 2018, Russell M. Nelson became the church's new president. As the apostle second in seniority to Nelson, Oaks became President of the Quorum of the Twelve Apostles. However, since Oaks was appointed as Nelson's first counselor in the First Presidency, M. Russell Ballard was appointed as the quorum's acting president. As first counselor in the First Presidency, Oaks serves as first vice chairman of the CES Board.

On June 1, 2018, Oaks gave the opening address at the First Presidency-sponsored "Be One" event, celebrating the 40th anniversary of the revelation extending the priesthood to all worthy males, regardless of race. Oaks spoke of seeing the hurt that the restriction had caused, moreso while he was a resident of Washington, D.C., and Chicago than he had seen in Utah. He also spoke of how the announcement had been a very emotional time for him. He noted that, prior to the 1978 announcement, having studied many explanations for the priesthood restriction, he concluded that he was not satisfied that any offered explanation for the restriction was inspired. Oaks called on people to not dwell too deeply on past policies but to look forward to a brighter future. He also denounced any prejudices, be they racial, ethnic, economic, or others and called on anyone who held such beliefs to repent.

In October 2020, Oaks gave a talk at general conference in which he encouraged civility and denounced racism. On October 27, 2020, he gave a BYU devotional address in which he again touched on this topic, explicitly endorsing the message "Black lives matter" while also discouraging its use to advance controversial propositions. In May 2022, Oaks delivered a eulogy at the funeral service of former Senator Orrin Hatch.

Awards and honors
Oaks earned the rank of Eagle Scout in 1947, and he was honored with the Distinguished Eagle Scout Award in 1984. He was named "Judge of the Year" by the Utah State Bar in 1984, and he was bestowed the Lee Lieberman Otis Award for Distinguished Service by the Federalist Society in 2012. He received the Canterbury Medal from the Becket Fund for Religious Liberty in 2013, and he received the Pillar of the Valley Award by Utah Valley Chamber of Commerce in 2014.  In 2021, he was honored by America's Freedom Festival for his lifetime of work promoting the values of God, family, freedom, and country. Oaks was named an honorary board member of the World Congress of Families.

Students at the University of Chicago Law School created the Dallin H. Oaks Society to "increase awareness within the Law School community of the presence, beliefs, and concerns of law students who are members of The Church of Jesus Christ of Latter-day Saints".

Family
Oaks married June Dixon on June 24, 1952. She died from cancer on July 21, 1998. They had six children, including Dallin D. Oaks, a linguistics professor at BYU, and Jenny Oaks Baker, a violinist. The last child the Oaks had was born 13 years after their fifth child.

On August 25, 2000, Oaks married Kristen Meredith McMain in the Salt Lake Temple. McMain was in her early 50s, and it was her first marriage; she had previously served a mission for the LDS Church in the Japan Sendai Mission. McMain has bachelor's and master's degrees from the University of Utah and a doctorate in curriculum and instruction from BYU.

Works
Articles

 
 
 
 
 
 
 
 
 
 

Books

 
 
 
 
 
 
 
 
 
 
 

Chapters

 
 
 

Speeches

See also
 Council on the Disposition of the Tithes
 Church Board of Education and Boards of Trustees
 List of law clerks of the Supreme Court of the United States (Chief Justice)

Notes

References

External links

Dallin H. Oaks, official church biography.
Dallin H. Oaks, Mormon Newsroom Leader Biographies.
Dallin H. Oaks, short biography.
Dallin H. Oaks, Dallin H. Oaks, BYU President
Dallin H. Oaks , Grampa Bill's G.A. (General Authority) Pages.
 
Dallin H. Oaks speeches, 1963–1982, L. Tom Perry Special Collections, Harold B. Lee Library, Brigham Young University
Dallin H. Oaks commencement speeches, 1972–1979, L. Tom Perry Special Collections, Harold B. Lee Library, Brigham Young University
Photograph of Dallin H. Oaks helping paint the Y, 1974, L. Tom Perry Special Collections, Harold B. Lee Library, Brigham Young University

1932 births
American Latter Day Saint writers
American general authorities (LDS Church)
American legal scholars
Apostles (LDS Church)
Brigham Young University alumni
Historians of the Latter Day Saint movement
Law clerks of the Supreme Court of the United States
Living people
Writers from Provo, Utah
Presidents of Brigham Young University
Justices of the Utah Supreme Court
University of Chicago faculty
University of Chicago Law School alumni
PBS people
People from Salt Lake City
People associated with Kirkland & Ellis
Counselors in the First Presidency (LDS Church)
University of Michigan staff
Latter Day Saints from Utah
Latter Day Saints from Illinois
American expatriates in the Philippines
Harold B. Lee Library-related University Archives articles
Brigham Young High School alumni